Ritter Adolf von Liebenberg or Liebenberg von Zsittin (September 15, 1851, in Como, Lombardy – May 6, 1920, in Vienna) was an Austrian agriculturalist and researcher into crop production (Getreidewissenschaftler, Agrarfachmann). He taught at Königsberg University and Vienna.

External links
 Adolf Ritter von Liebenberg und von Zsittin at www.catalogus-professorum-halensis.de 
 Österreichisches Biographisches Lexikon 1815-1950 - biography (pdf) 

Food scientists
Commanders of the Order of Franz Joseph
Austrian scientists
1851 births
1920 deaths